Patricia "Pat" Rafferty (Páidrigín Ní Reachtaire) was the 25th president of the Camogie Association, elected unopposed at the 2000 Congress.

Playing career
She played for Eoghan Ruadh, featuring in her club's Dublin three-in-a-row of 1966-68 and winning an All Ireland Club medal in 1967 and for Dublin in the 1967 and 1968 All Ireland Camogie finals.

Administration
She became Leinster provincial secretary in 1971 and was a candidate for secretary of the Camogie Association in 1975.

Presidency
During her presidency the All-Ireland Minor B Championship was inaugurated and won by Laois, and attendances at the annual All Ireland final started to climb form a level where they had been static for over thirty years.

Uniquely in camogie history, she contested the presidency again in 2009 after her successor's term had expired.

Career
She worked as a librarian in the National Institute of Research and Standards.

References

Living people
Dublin camogie players
Irish librarians
Women librarians
Presidents of the Camogie Association
Place of birth missing (living people)
Year of birth missing (living people)